The 1924 South Dakota Coyotes football team was an American football team that represented the University of South Dakota in the North Central Conference (NCC) during the 1924 college football season. In its third season under head coach Stub Allison, the team compiled a 6–2 record (4–1 against NCC opponents), finished in second place out of nine teams in the NCC, and outscored opponents by a total of 108 to 51.

Schedule

References

South Dakota
South Dakota Coyotes football seasons
South Dakota Coyotes football